The Type 905 (NATO reporting name: Fuqing) is a class of replenishment oiler (AOR) built for the People's Liberation Army Navy (PLAN) by the People's Republic of China (PRC). They were the first ships built to perform underway replenishment in the PLAN.

Four Type 905s were built. The three PLAN ships began entering service by the early-1980s. One was transferred to the Chinese merchant navy in 1989. The remainder were likely decommissioned by 2020. The fourth ship entered service with the Pakistan Navy in 1987.

Design
The Type 905 has three replenishment positions on each side; the forward two are for liquids, and the rear is for solids.

Ships of the class

References

Sources

Auxiliary replenishment ship classes
Fuqing-class replenishment ships